Ben Kaplan is a Harvard-trained economist, public commentator specializing in education, scholarships and economics, and author of the books How to Get to College Almost for Free and The Scholarship Scouting Report, published by HarperCollins. He has written columns for The New York Times, Time, and U.S. News & World Report. His "Scholars & Dollars" education column was launched in The Oregonian (Portland's daily newspaper) in 2006.  In 2008, he launched a companion radio feature on KMOX-AM in St. Louis. He is a graduate of South Eugene High School in Oregon.

Career and book
Kaplan obtained over two dozen scholarships totaling $90,000 from programs including the Coca-Cola Scholars Foundation, the Hugh O'Brian Youth Leadership Foundation, and the United States Senate Youth Program. This allowed him to finance most of his Harvard education, and led him to write the book How to Get to College Almost for Free, which was published by HarperCollins, after Kaplan successfully self-published. He was selected the "Top Student Leader in America" by the National Association of Secondary School Principals.

Media
Kaplan has provided media commentary for numerous outlets, including interviews on The Oprah Winfrey Show, Good Morning America, Nightline, NBC, CBS, ABC, CNN, Fox News, NPR, G4, and the BBC. In 2012, he was interviewed on Attack of the Show by comedian Ben Schwartz.

Start Up Chile

In 2012, Kaplan was invited to participate in global incubator Start-Up Chile. During this time he worked with start-ups from over 50 countries across the world—focusing on PR for smaller companies.

PR Hacker

Kaplan founded PR Hacker in 2013 with an office in San Francisco.

To date, the agency has represented Mercedes-Benz, Postmates, Meow Mix, and Budweiser. The company's services include PR, media planning, reputation management, digital marketing, and web development.

External links
 Ben Kaplan from HarperCollins Publishing

References

1977 births
Living people
Harvard University alumni
American non-fiction writers
Writers from Eugene, Oregon